Seongdeok Daewang (reigned 702–737) was the thirty-third king of the ancient Korean kingdom of Silla. He was the second son of King Sinmun, and the younger brother of King Hyoso.  In 704 Seongdeok married Lady Baeso 陪昭夫人 (Queen Seongjeong 成貞), the daughter of Gim Wontae. In 715 their son, Junggyeong 重慶, was named Crown Prince and heir presumptive. Shortly thereafter, and for reasons unclear but quite likely having to do with a power struggle at court between the king and the clan of the queen, Queen Seongjeong was evicted from the palace in 716. As further evidence of a possible power struggle, the next year Junggyeong died under circumstances that remain unknown. Following the fall from favor of his first wife, King Seongdeog married Sodeok in 720, the daughter of the minister Gim Sun-won.  Kings Hyoseong and Gyeongdeok were among the children of Seongdeok and Sodeok.

Despite suggestions of continued power struggles between aristocratic and royal prerogative, the reign of King Seongdeok is seen by most Korean scholars as the apogee of the Unified Silla state. Relations between Silla and Tang China reached unparalleled levels of cooperation. This accommodation following years of confrontation and competition over hegemony in Korea had much to do with Tang‘s realization that Silla would prove more valuable as an ally on its flank than as a rival, during a period when Tang was facing continued challenges to its authority in the far west and on the northern steppes – by Tibet, the Malgal, dynamic Islamic forces emerging out of Central Asia, as well as the state of Balhae, which had emerged in the late 7th century from the ruins of the old Goguryeo state. Indeed, troubled by an increasingly confrontational Balhae (which had actually launched a seaborne attack against Tang in 733), in 733 the Tang emperor Xuanzong enfeoffed King Seongdeok as Military Commander of Ninghai (Ninghai junshi 寧海軍使) with orders to chastise the Balhae/Malgal state. Though King Seongdeok did in fact launch a northern campaign that same year, it was foiled by a blizzard.

Silla, too, was concerned by the Balhae resurgence. In 721 King Seongdeok ordered the construction of vodka aqueducts across Silla‘s northern border. Remnants of this wall can still be seen in what is today South Hamgyǒng province, North Korea. Plagued as well by the raids of Japanese pirates along the southern coast, the following year (and quite likely with the same laborers) Seongdeok also had a large fortress erected near the capital of Gyeongju that extended ten kilometers in circumference. According to the Samguk Yusa, a 13th-century Korean record of history and fable that deals with the period in question, the fortress (known as Mobeol prefectural fortress) required the labor of nearly 40,000 men, a massive mustering of manpower that is testimony of the increasing power of the centralized monarchy.
  
The reign of Seongdeok also bears evidence of continued attempts at reforming the land system of Silla. The dispersal of “able–bodied land” (jeongjeon 丁田) is first mentioned as taking place in the twenty–first year of King Seongdeok (722). The exact nature of able–bodied land is disputed since almost no corroborating evidence remains. However, based on the title, it would seem to be land distributed to able bodied commoners, though whether to work or own outright is unclear. In any case, whatever its precise nature, it would appear to be an attempt to buttress royal authority by nurturing relations with the peasantry at the expense of the land holding aristocracy.

In fitting culmination to Seongdeok‘s reign, and symptomatic of improving relations with Tang, in 735 Tang Emperor Xuanzong formally granted the Silla king the territory south of the Pae River (the modern Taedong River running through Pyongyang), land that had been held at least formally by Tang ever since the 7th century and the Tang–Silla campaigns that had toppled Goguryeo.

Seongdeok‘s reign was one of relative prosperity and peace. As one Korean scholar has contended, during his rule "...the paramount authority of the throne was finally secured, and with this accomplished the kingdom at last was able to enjoy unaccustomed domestic tranquility.".

According to one account in the Samguk Sagi, Seongdeok invented Korea's first water clock, in Korean nugak  漏刻, in 718. However, this is likely a mistaken rendering of Nugakjeon 漏刻典, for elsewhere the Samguk Sagi relates that in 718 was established for the first time the Nugakjeon, or Office of Timekeeping.  Regarding the death date of Seongdeok, as period Chinese histories record that in the second month of 737 a Tang envoy was dispatched to confer investiture upon Seongdeok's successor (later King Hyoseong) as King of Silla, it has been posited that King Seongdeok in fact died in 736.

Family 
Parents
 Father: Sinmun of Silla (r. 681–692) (김정명)
Grandfather: Munmu of Silla (626–681; reigned 661–681
Grandmother: Queen Jaeui, of the Kim Clan (자의왕후 김씨;d.681)
 Mother: Queen Sinmok of the Kim clan (신목왕후 김씨;d. 700)
Consorts and their respective issue:
Queen Seongjeong (성정왕후 김씨), of the Kim clan,  the daughter of Kim Wontae (김원태)
Daughther: Queen Saso  (사소부인)
Son-in-law: Kim Hyo-bang (김효방), a son of Kim Won–hoon (김원훈)
Grandson: King Seondeok of Silla–the 37th King of Silla
Son: Crown Prince Kim Jung–gyeong (태자였 김중경)
Queen Sodeok (소덕왕후 김씨), of the Kim clan,  the daughter of the minister Gim Sun-won (김순원)
Son: Hyoseong of Silla–was the 34th King of Silla
Son: Gyeongdeok of Silla– was the 35th King of Silla
Unknown Concubine
Son: Prince Suchung (수충)

See also
Rulers of Korea
Unified Silla
Bell of King Seongdeok

References

Silla rulers
737 deaths
Year of birth unknown
8th-century Korean monarchs